Mỹ Hiệp is a rural commune (xã) and village of the Chợ Mới District of An Giang Province, Vietnam.

Communes of An Giang province
Populated places in An Giang province